Fernand Braudel (24 August 1902 – 27 November 1985) was a French historian and leader of the Annales School.  His scholarship focused on three main projects: The Mediterranean (1923–49, then 1949–66), Civilization and Capitalism (1955–79), and the unfinished Identity of France (1970–85). He was a member of the Annales School of French historiography and social history in the 1950s and 1960s. He was a student of Henri Hauser.

Braudel emphasized the role of large-scale socioeconomic factors in the making and writing of history. He can also be considered one of the precursors of world-systems theory.

Biography
Braudel was born in Luméville-en-Ornois (as of 1943, merged with and part of Gondrecourt-le-Château), in the département of the Meuse, France.  At the age of 7, his family moved to Paris. His father, who was a natural mathematician, aided him in his studies. Braudel also studied a good deal of Latin and a little Greek. Braudel was educated at the Lycée Voltaire  and the Sorbonne, where at the age of 20 he was awarded an agrégé in history. While teaching at the University of Algiers between 1923 and 1932, he became fascinated by the Mediterranean Sea and wrote several papers on the Spanish presence in Algeria in the 16th century. During this time, Braudel began his doctoral thesis on the foreign policy of King Philip II of Spain. From 1932 to 1935 he taught in the Paris lycées (secondary schools or high schools) of Pasteur, Condorcet, and Henri-IV.

By 1900, the French solidified their cultural influence in Brazil through the establishment of the Brazilian Academy of Fine Arts. São Paulo still lacked a university, however, and in 1934 francophile Julio de Mesquita Filho invited anthropologist Claude Lévi-Strauss and Braudel to help establish one. The result was formation of the new University of São Paulo.  Braudel later said that the time in Brazil was the "greatest period of his life."

In 1937, Braudel returned to Paris from Brazil. However, the journey was as significant as arriving at his destination; on his way, he met Lucien Febvre, who was the co-founder of the influential Annales journal. The two had booked passage on the same ship. Braudel had started archival research on his doctorate on the Mediterranean when he fell under the influence of the Annales School around 1938. Also around this time he entered the École pratique des hautes études as an instructor in history. He worked with Lucien Febvre, who would later read the early versions of Braudel's magnum opus and provide him with editorial advice.

At the outbreak of war in 1939, he was called up for military service and in 1940 was taken prisoner by the Germans. He was held at a POW camp in Mainz from 1940 to 1942 before being transferred to a POW camp near Lübeck, where he remained for the rest of the war. While in that camp, Braudel drafted his great work La Méditerranée et le Monde Méditerranéen à l'époque de Philippe II (The Mediterranean and the Mediterranean World in the Age of Philip II), without access to his books or notes and relying only on his prodigious memory and a local library.

Braudel became the leader of the second generation of Annales historians after 1945. In 1947, with Febvre and Charles Morazé, Braudel obtained funding from the Rockefeller Foundation in New York and founded the noted  Sixième Section for "Economic and social sciences" at the Ecole Pratique des Hautes Etudes.  He received an additional $1 million from the Ford Foundation in 1960.

In 1962, he and Gaston Berger used the Ford Foundation grant and government funds to create a new independent foundation, the Fondation Maison des Sciences de l'Homme (FMSH), which Braudel directed from 1970 until his death.  It was housed in the building called "Maison des Sciences de l'Homme". FMSH focused its activities on international networking in order to disseminate the Annales approach to Europe and the world.  In 1972 he gave up all editorial responsibility on the journal, although his name remained on the masthead.

In 1962, he wrote A History of Civilizations as the basis for a history course, but its rejection of the traditional event-based narrative was too radical for the French ministry of education, which in turn rejected it.

A feature of Braudel's work was his compassion for the suffering of marginal people. He articulated that most surviving historical sources come from the literate wealthy classes. He emphasized the importance of the ephemeral lives of slaves, serfs, peasants, and the urban poor, demonstrating their contributions to the wealth and power of their respective masters and societies. His work was often illustrated with contemporary depictions of daily life, rarely with pictures of noblemen or kings.

In 1949, Braudel was elected to the Collège de France upon Febvre's retirement. He co-founded the academic journal, Revue économique, in 1950.  He retired in 1968. In 1983, he was elected to the Académie française.

La Méditerranée
His first book, La Méditerranée et le Monde Méditerranéen à l'Epoque de Philippe II (1949) (The Mediterranean and the Mediterranean World in the Age of Philip II) was his most influential and has been described as a "watershed".

For Braudel there is no single Mediterranean Sea. There are many seas—indeed a "vast, complex expanse" within which men operate. Life is conducted on the Mediterranean: people travel, fish, fight wars, and drown in its various contexts. And the sea articulates with the plains and islands. Life on the plains is diverse and complex; the poorer south is affected by religious diversity (Catholicism and Islam), as well as by intrusions – both cultural and economic – from the north. In other words, the Mediterranean cannot be understood independently from what is exterior to it. Any rigid adherence to boundaries falsifies the situation.

The first level of time, geographical time, is that of the environment, with its slow, almost imperceptible change, its repetition and cycles. Such change may be slow, but it is irresistible. The second level of time comprises long-term social, economic, and cultural history, where Braudel discusses the Mediterranean economy, social groupings, empires and civilizations. Change at this level is much more rapid than that of the environment; Braudel looks at two or three centuries in order to spot a particular pattern, such as the rise and fall of various aristocracies. The third level of time is that of events (histoire événementielle). This is the history of individuals with names. This, for Braudel, is the time of surfaces and deceptive effects. It is the time of the "courte durée" proper and it is the focus of Part 3 of The Mediterranean which treats of "events, politics and people."

Braudel's Mediterranean is centered on the sea, but just as important, it is also the desert and the mountains. The desert creates a nomadic form of social organization where the whole community moves; mountain life is sedentary. Transhumance — that is, the movement from the mountain to the plain, or vice versa in a given season — is also a persistent part of Mediterranean existence.

Braudel's vast, panoramic view used insights from other social sciences, employed the concept of the longue durée, and downplayed the importance of specific events. It was widely admired, but most historians did not try to replicate it and instead focused on their specialized monographs. The book firmly launched the study of the Mediterranean and dramatically raised the worldwide profile of the Annales School.

Capitalism
After La Méditerranée, Braudel's most famous work is Civilisation Matérielle, Économie et Capitalisme, XVe-XVIIIe (Civilization and Capitalism, 15th-18th Century). The first volume was published in 1967, and was translated to English in 1973. The last of the three-volume work appeared in 1979. The work is a broad-scale history of the pre-industrial modern world, presented in the minute detail demanded by the methodological school called cliometrics, and focusing on how regular people made economies work. Like all Braudel's major works, the book mixed traditional economic material with thick description of the social impact of economic events on various facets of everyday life, including food, fashion, and other social customs. The third volume, subtitled "The Perspective of the World", was strongly influenced by the work of German scholars like Werner Sombart. In this volume, Braudel traced the impact of the centers of Western capitalism on the rest of the world. Braudel wrote the series both as a way of explanation for the modern way and partly as a refutation of the Marxist view of history.

Braudel discussed the idea of long-term cycles in the capitalist economy that he saw developing in Europe in the 12th century. Particular cities, and later nation-states, follow each other sequentially as centers of these cycles: Venice in the 13th through the 15th centuries (1250–1510); Antwerp and Genoa in the 16th century (1500–1569 and 1557–1627, respectively), Amsterdam in the 16th through 18th centuries (1627–1733); and London (and England) in the 18th and 19th centuries (1733–1896). He used the word "structures" to denote a variety of social structures, such as organized behaviours, attitudes, and conventions, as well as physical structures and infrastructures. He argued that the structures established in Europe during the Middle Ages contributed to the successes of present-day European-based cultures. He attributed much of this to the long-standing independence of city-states, which, though later subjugated by larger geographic states, were not always completely suppressed—probably for reasons of utility.

Braudel argued that capitalists have typically been monopolists and not, as is usually assumed, entrepreneurs operating in competitive markets. He argued that capitalists did not specialize and did not use free markets, thus diverging from both liberal (Adam Smith) and Marxian interpretations. In Braudel's view, the state in capitalist countries has served as a guarantor of monopolists rather than a protector of competition, as it is usually portrayed. He asserted that capitalists have had power and cunning on their side as they have arrayed themselves against the majority of the population.

An agrarian structure is a long-term structure in the Braudelian understanding of the concept. On a larger scale the agrarian structure is more dependent on the regional, social, cultural and historical factors than on the state's undertaken activities.

L'Identité de la France
Braudel's last and most personal book was L'Identité de la France (The Identity of France), which was unfinished at the time of his death in 1985. Unlike many of Braudel's other books, he made no secret of his profound love of his country,  remarking at the beginning that he had loved France as if she were a woman. Reflecting his interest with the longue durée, Braudel's concern in L'Identité de la France was with the centuries and millennia instead of the years and decades. Braudel argued that France was the product not of its politics or economics but rather of its geography and culture, a thesis Braudel explored in a wide-ranging book that saw the bourg and the patois: historie totale integrated into a broad sweep of both the place and the time. Unlike Braudel's other books, L'Identité de la France was much colored by a romantic nostalgia, as Braudel argued for the existence of la France profonde, a "deep France" based upon the peasant mentalité that despite all of the turmoil of French history and the Industrial Revolution had survived intact right up to the present.

Historiography
According to Braudel, before the Annales approach, the writing of history was focused on the courte durée (short span), or on histoire événementielle (a history of events).

His followers admired his use of the longue durée approach to stress the slow and often imperceptible effects of space, climate and technology on the actions of human beings in the past. The Annales historians, after living through two world wars and massive political upheavals in France, were very uncomfortable with the notion that multiple ruptures and discontinuities created history. They preferred to stress inertia and the longue durée, arguing that the continuities in the deepest structures of society were central to history. Upheavals in institutions or the superstructure of social life were of little significance, for history, they argued, lies beyond the reach of conscious actors, especially the will of revolutionaries. They rejected the Marxist idea that history should be used as a tool to foment and foster revolutions. A proponent of historical materialism, Braudel rejected Marxist materialism, stressing the equal importance of infrastructure and superstructure, both of which reflected enduring social, economic, and cultural realities.  Braudel's structures, both mental and environmental, determine the long-term course of events by constraining actions on, and by, humans over a duration long enough that they are beyond the consciousness of the actors involved.

Awards and honors

Honorary degrees 
 Université libre de Bruxelles
 University of Cambridge
 University of Chicago
 University of Cologne
 University of Geneva
 Leiden University
 University of Oxford
 University of Padua
 Complutense University of Madrid
 Université de Montréal
 University of Warsaw
 Yale University

Orders of Merit 
 Commander of the Legion of Honour
 Commander of the Ordre des Palmes académiques

Learned societies 
 Member of the Académie française
 Member of the American Academy of Arts and Sciences 
 Member of the Bavarian Academy of Sciences and Humanities
 Member of the Heidelberg Academy of Sciences and Humanities
 Member of the Hungarian Academy of Sciences
 Member of the Serbian Academy of Sciences and Arts

Legacy 
Binghamton University in New York had a Fernand Braudel Center until 2020, and there is an Instituto Fernand Braudel de Economia Mundial in São Paulo, Brazil.

In a 2011 poll by History Today magazine, Fernand Braudel was picked as the most important historian of the previous 60 years.

Main publications
La Méditerranée et le Monde Méditerranéen a l'époque de Philippe II, 3 vols. (originally appeared in 1949; revised several times)
 vol. 1: La part du milieu 
 vol. 2: Destins collectifs et mouvements d'ensemble 
 vol. 3: Les événements, la politique et les hommes 
 The Mediterranean and the Mediterranean World in the Age of Philip II. 2 vols. (second revised edition, translated 1972 and 1973 by Sian Reynolds) excerpt and text search vol 1; excerpt and text search vol 2
Ecrits sur l'Histoire (1969) 
Civilisation matérielle, économie et capitalisme, XVe-XVIIIe siècle
 vol. 1: Les structures du quotidien (1967) 
 vol. 2: Les jeux de l'échange (1979) 
 vol. 3: Le temps du monde (1979) 
Civilization and Capitalism, 15th–18th Century, translated by Siân Reynolds, 3 vols. (1979)
 vol. 1: The Structures of Everyday Life 
 vol. 2: The Wheels of Commerce 
 vol. 3: The Perspective of the World 
On History (1980; English translation of Ecrits sur l'Histoire by Siân Reynolds)
La Dynamique du Capitalisme (1985) 
L'Identité de la France (1986)
The Identity of France (1988–1990)
 vol. 1: History and Environment 
 vol. 2: People and Production 
Ecrits sur l'Histoire II (1990) 
Out of Italy, 1450–1650 (1991)
A History of Civilizations (1995)
Les mémoires de la Méditerranée (1998)
The Mediterranean in the Ancient World (UK) and Memories of the Mediterranean (USA; both 2001; English translation of Les mémoires de la Méditerranée by Siân Reynolds)
Personal Testimony Journal of Modern History, vol. 44, no. 4. (December 1972)

See also

 World-systems theory
 Arnold J. Toynbee
 Oswald Spengler
 Carroll Quigley

References

Further reading

 Akhttiar, Maher. "Lépistémologie de l'Histoire chez Fernand Braudel (2022) éditeur L'Harmattan
 Aurell, Jaume. "Autobiographical Texts as Historiographical Sources: Rereading Fernand Braudel and Annie Kriegel." Biography 2006 29(3): 425–445.  Fulltext: Project MUSE
 Burke, Peter. The French Historical Revolution: The Annales School 1929–89, (1990), excerpt and text search

 Carrard, Philippe. Poetics of the New History: French Historical Discourse from Braudel to Chartier, (1992)
Pierre Daix, Braudel, (Paris: Flammarion, 1995)
 Dosse, Francois. New History in France: The Triumph of the Annales, (1994, first French edition, 1987) excerpt and text search
Giuliana Gemelli, Fernand Braudel (Paris: Odile Jacob, 1995)
 Harris, Olivia. "Braudel: Historical Time and the Horror of Discontinuity." History Workshop Journal 2004 (57): 161–174.  Fulltext: OUP
 Hexter, J. H. "Fernand Braudel and the Monde Braudellien," Journal of Modern History, 1972, vol. 44, pp. 480–539  in JSTOR
 Hufton, Olwen. "Fernand Braudel", Past and Present, No. 112. (Aug., 1986), pp. 208–213. in JSTOR

 Kaplan, Steven Laurence. "Long-Run Lamentations: Braudel on France," The Journal of Modern History, Vol. 63, No. 2, A Special Issue on Modern France. (Jun., 1991), pp. 341–353. in JSTOR

* Lai, Cheng-chung. Braudel's Historiography Reconsidered, Maryland: University Press of America, 2004. 
 Moon, David. "Fernand Braudel and the Annales School" online edition

 Stoianovich, Traian. French Historical Method: The Annales Paradigm, (1976)
 Wallerstein, Immanuel. "Time and Duration: The Unexcluded Middle" (1997) online version

External links

 Professor David Moon, "Fernand Braudel and the Annales School" (lecture 2005)
 Braudel, Colonialism and the Rise of the West 
Fernand Braudel:Mediterranean studies:Annales school
Fernand Braudel Center
Instituto Fernand Braudel de Economia Mundial
  Annales School, Fernand Braudel bio
 Fernand Braudel, father of the modern pop-history genre - by blaqswans.org
 
 

1902 births
1985 deaths
20th-century French historians
20th-century French male writers
20th-century French people
Binghamton University buildings
Burials at Père Lachaise Cemetery
Academic staff of the Collège de France
Corresponding Fellows of the British Academy
Economic historians
French anti-capitalists
French historians of philosophy
French male non-fiction writers
French military personnel of World War II
French prisoners of war in World War II
Historians of France
Theoretical historians
Lycée Condorcet teachers
Lycée Henri-IV teachers
Members of the Académie Française
People from Meuse (department)
Theorists on Western civilization
Academic staff of the University of Paris
Academic staff of the University of São Paulo
World system scholars
Foreign members of the Serbian Academy of Sciences and Arts